The MAN SL200 was a transit bus manufactured by MAN between 1973 and 1988, and was based on the first generation German VöV-Standard-Bus body design. More than 5500 units were built of the standard left-hand drive version. There were also several right-hand drive chassis versions available for external bodywork, some of which were delivered with the body frame.

History
The SL200 was superseded by the SL202.

Customers

Australia
The SL200 was popular with government operators with ACTION purchasing 151, Brisbane City Council 180, the Metropolitan Transport Authority, Melbourne 158 and the State Transit Authority 138.

New Zealand
The Auckland Regional Council purchased 88 SL200s.

References

External links

SL200
Vehicles introduced in 1974